Sebastian Nowak (born 16 May 1975) is a former Polish footballer who played as a defender. His playing career lasted just over 10 years, during which time he made 90 appearances and scored 5 goals in the I liga, while also retiring with two honours to his name.

Biography

Nowak started his career playing for the youth side of Polonia Leszno, eventually being promoted to the first team in January 1994. After a year with Polonia he joined I liga team Olimpia Poznań, making 6 appearances in his first season in Poland's top division. For the 1995–96 season Olimpia were involved in a merger with Lechia Gdańsk, creating the Olimpia-Lechia Gdańsk team. Olimpia-Lechia Gdańsk took Olimpia Poznań's place in the I liga, while the Lechia Gdańsk team from the previous season was renamed as Lechia Gdańsk II and operated as the clubs official second team, playing in the III liga after the previous seasons relegation. Nowak was a part of the team in the I liga, making his debut against Śląsk Wrocław on 29 July 1995. He went on to make 7 appearances for Olimpia-Lechia before being involved in a transfer in November to join II liga team Polonia Warsaw. His time at Polonia did not last long, and after making only 2 league appearances he returned to Olimpia-Lechia in February 1996. Upon his return to the team, he went on to make a further 6 appearances in the I liga, while also playing in the III liga with the Lechia Gdańsk II team, also making 6 appearances. At the end of the season Olimpia-Lechia were relegated, and the Olimpia-Lechia team were dissolved. The Lechia Gdańsk team that ran as the clubs second team took the place of the Olimpia-Lechia team in the league, and operated as an independent first team again. 

Nowak did not stay at the club to see the process of transitioning between clubs once again, deciding instead to stay in the I liga with Stomil Olsztyn. It was with Stomil that Nowak enjoyed his greatest individual success as a footballer. Over the next two seasons he consistently played for Stomil in the top division, and making 51 league appearances with the club, the only time in his career he would make 50 appearances for one club. While his time with Stomil was the greatest in terms of individual success, it was his next move that brought about his greatest success with a team. 

In 1998 Nowak joined Legia Warsaw, making his debut on 31 July 1998 against his previous club, Stomil. In his first season with Legia he made 13 appearances in the I liga, the most he would make in one season for the club. The following season Nowak only made 2 league appearances, and found himself playing with the Legia II team the season after that. During the season after he was dropped from the first team, Nowak was loaned to Odra Opole, however he only managed to make one appearance for the team in the II liga. Over the summer Nowak managed to get himself in the first teams plans again, and made 4 league appearances as Legia went on to win the I liga. That same season Nowak played 6 times in the Polish League Cup, with Legia winning the League Cup after playing a two legged final with Wisła Kraków. At the start of the following season Nowak only made 2 more appearances for the club, and was transferred to Aluminium Konin over the winter break. During the four years with Legia Nowak only managed to make 32 appearances in all competitions. Nowak spent 12 months with Aluminium Konin, playing 29 times in the league, and scoring one goal. In the final 12 months of his playing career he spent time with RKS Radomsko and Kania Gostyń, retiring from playing at the end of 2004.

Honours
Legia Warsaw
I liga: 2001–2002
Polish League Cup: 2001–2002

References

1975 births
Living people
Polish footballers
Association football defenders
Olimpia Poznań players
Lechia Gdańsk players
Polonia Warsaw players
OKS Stomil Olsztyn players
Legia Warsaw players
Odra Opole players
Górnik Konin players